Polyploca latens is a moth in the family Drepanidae. It is found in Azerbaijan.

References

Moths described in 2008
Thyatirinae
Moths of Asia